Let Women Alone is a 1925 American silent comedy film directed by Paul Powell and starring Pat O'Malley, Wanda Hawley and Wallace Beery.

Plot
After her husband is reportedly drowned at sea, his wife supports herself and their child by setting up a small interior decorating shop. She falls in love with Tom Benham, an insurance agent but her uncle a Commodore opposes the match and tries to thwart her business. Things take a dramatic shift when her husband reappears alive and involved with a racket smuggling Chinese illegal immigrants into America. He kidnaps her and the commodore and Tom give chase and rescue her.

Cast
 Pat O'Malley as Tom Benham
 Wanda Hawley as Beth Wylie
 Wallace Beery as Cap Bullwinkle
 Ethel Wales as Ma Benham
 J. Farrell MacDonald as Commodore John Gordon
 Harris Gordon as Jim Wylie
 Betty Jane Snowdon as Jean Wylie
 Lee Willard as Alec Morrison
 Marjorie Morton as Isabel Morrison

References

Bibliography
 Connelly, Robert B. The Silents: Silent Feature Films, 1910-36, Volume 40, Issue 2. December Press, 1998.
 Munden, Kenneth White. The American Film Institute Catalog of Motion Pictures Produced in the United States, Part 1. University of California Press, 1997.

External links
 

1925 films
1925 comedy films
1920s English-language films
American silent feature films
Silent American comedy films
American black-and-white films
Films directed by Paul Powell (director)
Producers Distributing Corporation films
1920s American films